Simple Songs is the third and final singer-songwriter album by American musician Jim O'Rourke for Drag City. It was released on May 19, 2015, nearly fourteen years after O'Rourke's previous singer-songwriter album Insignificance (2001).

Critical reception

At Metacritic, which assigns a normalized rating out of 100 to reviews from mainstream critics, the album received an average score of 86 based on 14 professional reviews, which indicates "universal acclaim".

Accolades

Track listing

Personnel
The following people contributed to Simple Songs:
Main personnel
 Jim O'Rourke – vocals, guitar
 Sudoh Toshiaki – bass
 Tatsuhisa Yamamoto – drums
 Akiko Yoshino – french horn (4, 6, 7, 8)
 Ren Takada – pedal steel guitar (5)
 Eiko Ishibashi – piano, organ
 Jun Moriyama – saxophone (3)
 Nahoko Kamei – saxophone (3, 7)
 Atsuko Hatano – strings
 Daysuke Takaoka – tuba (2, 3, 6, 8)
Additional personnel
 John Golden – mastering
 Kuniyoshi Taikou – photography

References

2015 albums
Drag City (record label) albums
Jim O'Rourke (musician) albums